John Leigh may refer to:

Politicians
John Leigh (MP for Hythe) 1421–1432, MP for Hythe (UK Parliament constituency)
Sir John Leigh (died 1612), English MP for Grampound, Launceston and Helston
Sir John Leigh (Yarmouth MP) (c.1598–c.1666), Member of Parliament for Yarmouth 1640–1648, 1660–1661
John Leigh (died 1620) (1562–1620), English Member of Parliament for Bedford, 1614
John Leigh (died 1689) (c.1651–1689), English Member of Parliament for Newport, 1675–1689
John Leigh (died 1743) (c.1670–1743), English Member of Parliament for Newtown, 1702–1705
John Leigh (Wisconsin politician) (1827–1893), American politician
Sir John Leigh, 1st Baronet (1884–1959), British mill-owner, newspaper proprietor and Conservative Party politician

Others
John Leigh (18th-century actor) (1689–1726), Irish actor and dramatist
Jack Leigh (1948–2004), American photographer and author
John Leigh (ambassador), Sierra Leone
John Leigh (actor) (born 1965), New Zealand actor, appeared as Háma in The Lord of the Rings: The Two Towers
John Leigh (doctor) (1812-1888), English doctor and public health administrator

See also
John Legh (disambiguation)
John Lee (disambiguation)
John Lea (disambiguation)